Lek Majhi Durga is an Indian Marathi language television series which is written by Abhijeet Guru. The show premiered from 14 February 2022 and ended on 16 September 2022 aired on Colors Marathi. It stars Swapnil Pawar and Rashmi Anpat in lead roles. It is an official remake of Hindi show Shakti - Astitva Ke Ehsaas Ki.

Cast 
 Varada Patil / Rashmi Anpat as Durga
 Swapnil Pawar as Jaysingh
 Payal Memane
 Hemangi Kavi
 Sushil Inamdar
 Sai Ranade
 Anand Kale / Rajesh Deshpande
 Mrunal Deshpande
 Sanket Korlekar
 Sohan Nandurdikar
 Sandesh Jadhav

Adaptations

References

External links 
 
 Lek Majhi Durga at Voot

2022 Indian television series debuts
Colors Marathi original programming
Marathi-language television shows
2022 Indian television series endings